Margaretta Lena Brucker (1883–1958) was an American fiction author active from approximately 1937 until 1958.

Brucker wrote juvenile fiction, mysteries, and serial stories for newspapers.  She also published a number of romance novels using the pseudonym Margaret Howe.

Her nephew, Roger Brucker, credits her with inspiring him to become a writer.

References

1883 births
20th-century American novelists
1958 deaths
American children's writers
American mystery writers
American women short story writers
American romantic fiction writers
American women novelists
American women children's writers
Women romantic fiction writers
Women mystery writers
20th-century American women writers
20th-century American short story writers
Pseudonymous women writers
20th-century pseudonymous writers